Analbuminaemia or analbuminemia is a genetically inherited metabolic defect characterised by an impaired synthesis of serum albumin. Although albumin is the most common serum protein, analbuminaemia is a benign condition.

References

External links 

Inborn errors of metabolism
Albumin disorders